The Mayagüez Resort & Casino is the largest hotel resort in western Puerto Rico.

Facilities
The hotel has two restaurants, a large conference center, a casino, and a newly constructed river pool.  It was the main hotel for the 2010 Central American and Caribbean Games.

History
The hotel is located on the land where the Valdes Castle once stood.  The Hotel was built and operated originally by the Hilton brand and was originally named Mayagüez Hilton. Later on a group of local investors bought the hotel.

See also

 List of casinos in Puerto Rico
 List of hotels in Puerto Rico

References

Buildings and structures in Mayagüez, Puerto Rico
Hotels in Puerto Rico
Tourist attractions in Mayagüez, Puerto Rico
Casinos in Puerto Rico
Casino hotels